Amy Yoder Begley (née Yoder; born January 11, 1978 in Topeka, Indiana) is an American middle and long-distance runner and a US Olympian in the 10,000 meter event at the 2008 Summer Olympics in Beijing. Yoder Begley lives in Atlanta, Georgia, where she is coach of the Atlanta Track Club, assisted by her husband Andrew Begley.

High school career

Yoder Begley attended East Noble High School in Kendallville, Indiana. She was a four-time state champion (one cross country and three 3200 meter titles) and held the 3200 meter state record from 1996 until 2011 when it was broken by Culver Academy's Waverly Neer.

Collegiate career

Yoder Begley graduated from the University of Arkansas in 2001. She was a two-time NCAA champion and a 15-time All-American. She was 2000 SEC Female Athlete of the Year, and in 2016 she was selected to the Southeastern Conference 2016 Class of Women's Legends representing Arkansas. She won the Honda Sports Award as the nation's top female cross country runner in 2000.

Professional career
In 2006, Yoder Begley was diagnosed with Celiac Disease.

Yoder Begley was a Nike Oregon Project athlete from 2007 to 2011. She trained with Galen Rupp, Kara Goucher, Adam Goucher, and Josh Rohatinsky under coach Alberto Salazar, who was later banned for life.

Yoder Begley placed third in the 10,000 meters at the 2008 USA Track & Field Olympic Trials in Eugene, Oregon, setting a new personal record of 31:43.60 and qualifying for the 2008 Summer Olympics in Beijing.  She placed 26th in the final of the 10,000 meters at the Olympics.

Yoder Begley finished first in the 10,000 meter event at the 2009 USA Track & Field Championship on June 25, 2009, in Eugene, Oregon. This qualified her to compete in the 12th IAAF World Championships in Athletics held in Berlin. She finished in sixth place and set a new personal record with a time of 31:13.78.

In 2013, she became the women's cross country coach and women's track and field assistant coach at the University of Connecticut.

In December 2014 she was hired as the first full-time coach in the 50-year history of the Atlanta Track Club. Among her responsibilities are creating training programs for the club's 21,000 members and training two athletes for the 2020 Summer Olympics.

Highlights

 15-Time NCAA All-American in Cross Country and Track
 2-Time NCAA National Champion in Track
 2000 USA Olympic Trials Qualifier
2000 Honda Sports Award winner for cross country
 2001 Avon National 10k Champion
 2002 United States Team Member - Beijing Ekiden
 2002 RRCA Road Scholar Grant Recipient
 2002 Avon Global Championships Runner-up
 2004 USA Olympic Trials Qualifier
 2004 USATF 10k Road National Champion
 2008 US Olympic Team, 10k
 2009 USATF Indoor 3k champion
 2009 USA 15k Championship - 1st Place
 2009 USA Outdoor Track and Field Championships 10k, 1st place. Set personal and track record with a time of 31:22.69
 2009 World Championships in Athletics 10k, 6th place.

See also
 List of people diagnosed with coeliac disease

References

External links
 Website of Amy Yoder Begley
 

Living people
1978 births
American female middle-distance runners
American female long-distance runners
Arkansas Razorbacks women's track and field athletes
Olympic track and field athletes of the United States
Athletes (track and field) at the 2008 Summer Olympics
People from LaGrange County, Indiana
People from Kendallville, Indiana
Track and field athletes from Indiana
Track and field athletes from Atlanta
USA Outdoor Track and Field Championships winners
USA Indoor Track and Field Championships winners
LGBT track and field athletes